Bill Hogan is a Canadian Progressive Conservative politician who has represented Carleton in the Legislative Assembly of New Brunswick since 2020. Prior to his political career, Hogan was a schoolteacher and later principal of Woodstock High School in Woodstock, New Brunswick.

Political career 
Hogan served on the town council for Woodstock, New Brunswick since 2010 until his election as MLA.

Hogan was elected to the Legislative Assembly of New Brunswick at the 2020 New Brunswick general election as a member of the New Brunswick Progressive Conservative Party.

On February 23, 2021, Hogan became the province's Minister of Public Safety.

On October 13, 2022, he became Minister of Education and Early Childhood Development, replacing Dominic Cardy who resigned.

References 

Living people
Progressive Conservative Party of New Brunswick MLAs
21st-century Canadian politicians
People from Woodstock, New Brunswick
People from Carleton County, New Brunswick
Canadian schoolteachers
Year of birth missing (living people)